Suzanne Chodowiecka (1763/64 – 1819) was a German painter. Her first name is sometimes spelled Susanne; also known as Suzette or Susette, she was also known as Mme. Henry after her marriage.

Born in Berlin, Chodowiecka was the middle daughter of painter Daniel Chodowiecki; her sisters Jeannette and Henriette also became artists. A pupil of Anton Graff, she became a member of the Prussian Academy of Arts in 1789 and exhibited work, including copies of old master paintings in the royal collection, on numerous occasions. Active as a genre painter and portraitist, among her subjects were members of the Prussian royal family. She was married to a member of the clergy, as was her sister Jeannette.

References

Year of birth uncertain
1760s births
1819 deaths
German women painters
18th-century German painters
18th-century German women artists
19th-century German painters
19th-century German women artists
German portrait painters
German genre painters
Artists from Berlin
Sibling artists